Typhoon Della
Typhoon Della (1949)
Typhoon Della (1952)
Typhoon Della (1960)
Typhoon Della (1968)
Tropical Storm Della (1971)
Typhoon Della (1974)
Tropical Storm Della (1978)

Pacific typhoon set index articles